Skircoat is an electoral ward in Calderdale, West Yorkshire, England, and returns three members to sit on Calderdale Metropolitan Borough Council. The population at the 2011 Census was 12,712. It covers the area of Skircoat Green.

Election results

Returned Councillors

The percentage changes are calculated in comparison to the party performances in the previous election.

2019 Election
The incumbent was Marcus Thompson for the Conservative Party who stood down at this election.

2018 Election
The incumbent was Andrew Tagg for the Conservative Party.

2016 Election
The incumbent was John Hardy for the Conservative Party.

2015 Election
The incumbent was Marcus Thompson for the Conservative Party.

2014 Election
The incumbent was Pauline Nash for the Liberal Democrats.

2012 Election
The incumbent was John Hardy for the Conservative Party.

2011 Election
The incumbent was Stephen Gow for the Liberal Democrats.

2010 Election
The incumbent was Grenville Horsfall for the Conservative Party.

2009 By-Election
The incumbent was Geoffrey Wainwright for the Conservative Party. The by-election was triggered by his sudden death.

2008 Election
The incumbent was Geoffrey Wainwright for the Conservative Party.

2007 Election
The incumbent was John Ford for the Conservative Party.

2006 Election
The incumbent was Grenville Horsfal for the Conservative Party.

2004 Election
The ward was created after boundary changes in the 2004 election. All three councillor posts were up for election and each elector had three votes.

The same results expressed by party

References

Wards of Calderdale